The women's team time trial of the 1992 UCI Road World Championships cycling event took place on 5 September 1992 in Benidorm, Spain. The course was 50 km long.

Final classification

Source

References

1992 UCI Road World Championships
UCI Road World Championships – Women's team time trial
UCI